, also known as Designated Violent Girl Shiomi-chan, is a Japanese manga series written and illustrated by Kazurou Inoue. It was published by Shogakukan in the magazine Shōnen Sunday S from May 2016 to October 2018,<ref name="Dengeki Daioh">{{cite web |url=https://www.animenewsnetwork.com/news/2018-09-30/shitei-boryoku-shojo-shiomi-chan-manga-by-midori-days-inoue-ends-in-october/.137490 |title=Shitei Bōryoku Shōjo Shiomi-chan Manga by Midori Days''' Inoue Ends in October |website=Anime News Network |access-date=30 September 2018 }}</ref> and has been collected in five tankōbon volumes. The series follows mob boss Shiomi who one day must go into hiding to protect their life from potential assassins. Opting to get plastic surgery, only to end up looking like a teenage girl, they resolve to stay like this until their life is no longer in danger.

Characters

A 56-year-old leader of the Hitotsubashi crime group, who, thanks to plastic surgery, turned into a schoolgirl. In the guise of a girl, she uses the pseudonym . The basis of the new appearance of Shiomi, the surgeon who worked with him took the appearance of a famous idol and now this idol and Shiomi are similar as two drops of water. This causes additional problems for Shiomi, who tries not to attract too much attention. Despite the fact that Shiomi was turned into a girl, they still retain the physical strength of a seasoned bandit. Also, despite their attempts to impersonate a child, Shiomi's gangster habits often make themselves felt.
Tatsuya Umemiya
A classmate of Shiomi named for Tatsuo Umemiya, who in the past saved him from the police, and later himself saved by Shiomi from school hooligans. Tatsuya is in love with the female version of Shiomi and does not hide his feelings, however, he does not meet reciprocity.

Volumes
The series includes 30 chapters, which have been collected into five tankōbon'' volumes, the first of which was published in February 2017.

References

External links

  at Shogakukan 

2016 manga
School life in anime and manga
Shogakukan manga
Shōnen manga